Coiled sewn sandals are an ancient Egyptian footwear constructed using a technique similar to that used in basket weaving with a technique whereby coils were sewn together with the same material used in construction of the coils. The shoes were typically woven using halfa grass.

References 

Footwear
Egyptian artefact types